First auto may refer to:

 The First Auto, a 1927 film
 Benz Patent-Motorwagen, the first automobile